Charged Up, stylized as CHARGED UP and officially known as Charged Up presented by Haas for sponsorship reasons, is the FIRST Robotics Competition game for the 2023 season. The game is part of the FIRST-wide FIRST Energize theme for the 2022-2023 season, which focuses on energy and sustainable development. The season's kickoff event occurred on January 7, 2023, and was streamed live on Twitch.

As in the 2022 season, the 2023 season will feature only one championship event as opposed to the two events that took place from 2017 to 2019 (and that were planned for 2020). In an effort to increase the number of teams that can attend the championship, there will be no Week 7 events this season to allow late-qualifying teams more time to prepare for the event and travel to Houston. Additionally, championship qualifying criteria may be modified to allow more teams to qualify for the event. On October 20, FIRST announced that the championship will be expanded to at least 600 teams in 8 divisions, making it the largest event in FRC history.

Field and Scoring
The field is surrounded by low polycarbonate walls on the long sides and taller alliance station walls on the short sides. The Single Substations (part of the human player stations) on the long sides also feature a taller wall made of wire mesh panels.

The field is divided in half by a white line, and each half includes one alliance's Community and the other alliance's Loading Zone. The primary scoring areas are the two Communities (one per alliance), which are located near the two alliance station walls. Robots begin the match fully contained within their alliance's Community. Each Community includes a Grid where game pieces can be scored and a Charging Station that robots can drive onto and balance on during the autonomous period and towards the end of the match.

Game Pieces
There are two game pieces in Charged Up: Cones  and Cubes. Cubes are cube-like objects made of purple fabric that are inflated to approximately  when measured from face to face. Cubes have rounded corners and may not have flat surfaces.

Player Areas

Alliance Stations
There are two alliance stations on the short sides of the field, one for each alliance. Each station is divided into three smaller stations where the teams that make up the alliance control their robots. The opposing alliance's Loading Zone is located on the far side of each alliance's station when viewed from the scoring table.

Loading Zones
The Loading Zones, or human player stations, are used to introduce game pieces onto the field and form a right angle around the two far corners of the field. Each Zone consists of a Single Substation and a Double Substation, with the former located on a long side of the field and the latter located on a short side next to the opposing alliance's station. Each substation includes a portal that human players can place game pieces into. The Single Substation's portal is a ramp that drops the game piece onto the field, while the Double Substation's portal can either be used to drop a piece onto the field or place the piece on a sliding shelf for one of the alliance's robots to pick up.

Scoring Areas

Grids
The six Grids (three for each alliance) are located in front of their respective alliance station wall. Each set of grids consists of two outer grids and a coopertition (co-op) grid, each of which are divided into three rows (top, middle, and bottom). Within each grid, game pieces can be placed on nine Nodes, with two Nodes reserved for Cubes and four Nodes reserved for Cones. The remaining three Nodes, known as hybrid nodes, can accept either game piece. Alliances earn points for placing game pieces on the Nodes, with more points awarded for pieces scored on Nodes in the top and middle rows of each grid.

Alliances can also earn points by placing game pieces on three adjacent Nodes in the same row, which is known as a Link. If five Links are created, the alliance earns the Sustainability Bonus ranking point (RP). This threshold can be lowered to four for both alliances if both of the co-op grids have at least three game pieces placed in them.

Charging Stations
Similar to the bridges in Rebound Rumble, the Charging Stations can be driven onto and balanced by robots in order to earn points in both the autonomous and teleoperated periods. While the stations are large enough to fit all three of an alliance's robots, only one robot can score points on their alliance's station during the autonomous period.

In both periods, points can be earned if a robot Docks or Engages with their alliance's station. A robot is Docked if they are only contacting their Charging Station and/or other objects (ex. other robots) that are directly or transitively supported by the station. A Docked robot is also Engaged if their Charging Station is level and all other robots from their alliance that are contacting the station are Docked. Additionally, alliances can earn the Activation Bonus RP by scoring at least 26 Charging Station points during the match.

Scoring Summary

Events
The 2023 regular season is divided into six weeks, with many events occurring simultaneously during each week. After the end of the regular season, teams that have qualified compete in the FIRST Championship in Houston.

Week 1

Week 2

Week 3

Week 4

Week 5

Week 6

FIRST Championship

References

Robotics competitions
FIRST Robotics Competition games